Omnium II (1892-1901) was a Thoroughbred racehorse in France. He was purchased from the Countess Paul Le Marois at the Deauville Yearling sale by Count Evremond de Saint-Alary. He won a number of important French races and was a great long-distance horse, winning the 6,200 meter Prix Gladiateur in 1896 and another endurance test, the Prix Rainbow.

Omnium was retired to Saint-Alary's Haras de Saint Pair du Mont breeding farm at Le Cadran in Calvados, Normandy where he proved to be an important sire. He produced the filly Kizil Kourgan (1899-1919), winner of the Prix de Diane and the Grand Prix de Paris and was the damsire of Bruleur. Born in 1910, Bruleur won the 1913 Grand Prix de Paris and Prix Royal-Oak then at stud became the Leading sire in France for 1921, 1924, and 1929.

Despite dying at age nine, Omnium's successful progeny made him the leading sire in France in 1902.

Sire line tree

Omnium II
Arizona

References

 Omnium II's pedigree and racing stats

1892 racehorse births
1901 racehorse deaths
Racehorses bred in France
Racehorses trained in France
French Thoroughbred Classic Race winners
Champion Thoroughbred Sires of France
Thoroughbred family 22-c